Turridrupa consobrina is a species of sea snail, a marine gastropod mollusk in the family Turridae, the turrids.

Description
The length of the shell varies between 9 mm and 16 mm.

Distribution
This marine species occurs off the Philippines, Hawaii and Japan.

References

External links
 Powell, A.W.B. (1967) The family Turridae in the Indo-Pacific. Part 1a. The subfamily Turrinae concluded. Indo-Pacific Mollusca, 1, 409–444
 Tardy, E. & Stahlschmidt, P. (2022). Shallow water turrids of Ile des Pins, New Caledonia (Mollusca, Gastropoda). Revue Suisse de Zoologie. 129(1): 167-219

consobrina
Gastropods described in 1967